Bắc Giang is a city in Vietnam. It is the capital of Bắc Giang Province. Its name, deriving from that of the Province Sino-Vietnamese, means "north of the river."  The location is very convenient for transportation: it is 50 km north of Hanoi, in the middle position on major transportation routes (roads, international railway) connecting Hanoi with the Lạng Sơn City and Đồng Đăng international border gate; Bắc Giang is located in an important transportation hub. The Thương River runs through the town's southern part heading for Haiphong.

Although the name of Bắc Giang (北江 "North River") Province is very old, established in its first form in 1466, there was historically no town of that name. The town was created out the old Láng Thượng District after independence. The Suối Mỡ thermal springs area is 37 km from the town centre. Bắc Giang Peace Park was a sister city project with Madison, Wisconsin, United States.

Economic situation
 
Bắc Giang City is a center of the nitrogen - chemical industry, textile industry, also the distribution center, transit of goods from China, as well as the place for local products being exported to China. The city has some small- and medium-sized industrial zones associated with large industrial zones such as Quang Châu, Đình Trám, Vân Trung and Song Khê - Nội Hoàng. The emblem of the BG industry is the Hà Bắc fertilizer factory, the first fertilizer plant in Vietnam.

In 2013, Bắc Giang City maintained high and stable economic growth reaching 17.3%, with the GDP per capita reaching $3000. The economic structure has shifted positively: trade and services 45.2%; industry, handicraft - construction 51.3%; agriculture - fishery 3.5%. The city has developed diverse industries such as agricultural and forestry processing, mechanical, chemical, textile, electronic and construction materials. Bắc Giang City is well known as one of the distribution centers for the transit of goods imported from China to Vietnam and vice versa. The service network has been developed strongly with large-scale supermarkets such as Big C Bắc Giang, Co.opmart supermarket, Bắc Giang Supermarket, Imexco Supermarket, Mediamart, Văn Chiến appliances and electrics store.

Administrative subdivisions
The city is subdivided to 16 commune-level subdivisions, including the wards of: Đa Mai, Dĩnh Kế, Hoàng Văn Thụ, Lê Lợi, Mỹ Độ, Ngô Quyền, Thọ Xương, Trần Nguyên Hãn, Trần Phú, Xương Giang and the rural communes of: Dĩnh Trì, Đồng Sơn, Song Khê, Song Mai, Tân Mỹ and Tân Tiến.

Gallery

Climate

References

 
Districts of Bắc Giang province
Populated places in Bắc Giang province
Provincial capitals in Vietnam
Cities in Vietnam